Kaskelen (Qaskeleñ) is a town and seat of Karasay District in Almaty Region of south-eastern Kazakhstan. Population:

References 

Populated places in Almaty Region